Supermini is a class of automobile larger than a city car but smaller than a small family car, also known as the B-segment.

Supermini may also refer to:

 Gurgel Supermini, a small Brazilian car produced 1992–1994
 Superminicomputer, a 1970s term for a minicomputer

See also
Subcompact car